Alchorneopsis is a genus of flowering plants in the family Euphorbiaceae first described as a genus in 1865. It is native to Central America, the Greater Antilles, and northern South America.

Species
 Alchorneopsis floribunda (Benth.) Müll.Arg. - Costa Rica, Honduras, Panama, Puerto Rico, Dominican Republic, 3 Guianas, Colombia, Venezuela, Ecuador, Peru, NW Brazil
 Alchorneopsis portoricensis Urb. - Puerto Rico  (considered by some authors to be a synonym for A. floribunda)

References

Euphorbiaceae genera
Acalyphoideae